Derrick Jensen (born December 19, 1960) is an American ecophilosopher, writer, author, teacher and environmentalist in the anarcho-primitivist tradition, though he rejects the label "anarchist". Utne Reader named Jensen among "50 Visionaries Who Are Changing the World" in 2008, and Democracy Now! says that he "has been called the poet-philosopher of the ecology movement". 

Jensen is a critic of the mainstream environmental movement's focus on preserving civilization and technology over preserving the natural world. He specifically challenges the lifestyle changes and individualistic solutions broadly advocated, considering them drastically inadequate to the global scale of environmental catastrophe. Instead, he promotes civil disobedience, radical activism, and dismantling infrastructure on a massive level in order to halt what he has called "the murder of the planet". 

Jensen is a founder and leader within Deep Green Resistance; his and the organization's belief that women-only spaces should exclude trans women has been the subject of controversy.

Jensen lives in Crescent City, California.

Selected works 
 
 
 
 
 
 , Seven Stories Press,

References

Further reading 

 
 
 

1960 births
Living people
21st-century American male writers
21st-century American non-fiction writers
21st-century American novelists
American anti-capitalists
American environmentalists
American feminist writers
American male non-fiction writers
American male novelists
American non-fiction environmental writers
Anti-consumerists
Colorado School of Mines alumni
Deep ecologists
Eastern Washington University alumni
Ecofeminists
Ecophilosophers
Feminist musicians
Male feminists
Writers from Colorado
Writers from Washington (state)